The Central Building is a historic building at 810 3rd Avenue in downtown Seattle, in the U.S. state of Washington. C.R. Aldrich designed the structure following the 1906 San Francisco earthquake.

References

External links 

 

Buildings and structures in Seattle
Downtown Seattle